Klondyke is an unincorporated community in Clinton Township, Vermillion County, in the U.S. state of Indiana.

History
The town was named for the local Klondyke Mines, which were active in the early 1900s.

Geography
Klondyke is located at  (39.668400, -87.437790).

References

Unincorporated communities in Vermillion County, Indiana
Unincorporated communities in Indiana
Terre Haute metropolitan area